KAPP Werkzeugmaschinen GmbH is a manufacturer of machines and tools for finishing of gears and profiles. About a third of the turnover is made in Germany and two-thirds in international operations. [1] The company headquartered in Coburg (Bavaria) was founded in 1953.

History 

In 1953, Bernhard Kapp, managing director and partner of the company Waldrich Coburg, founded the machine building company KAPP & Co.. The company started its activities with the continuation of the production program of woodworking machines from COMAG (Coburger Maschinenbau GmbH), whose assets were purchased.

In 1958, the company began the construction of tool grinding machines. Surface and profile grinding as well as milling machines were built. According to the statement of the company, in 1975 the largest hob grinding machine of the world was produced. In 1977 Bernhard Kapp resigned from the Waldrich company and devoted his professional activities only to his own company.

Since the 1980s KAPP provides profile grinding machines among others for the aerospace and automotive industry as well as for transmission manufacturers. In 1981, worldwide the first non-dressable profile grinding wheel with CBN technology has been developed. In the 1980s, four subsidiaries were established: KAPP TECHNOLOGIES in the USA, KAPP Technologie in Coburg, KAPP TEC in Brazil and KAPP JAPAN TECHNOLOGIES in Japan.

In 1983, Martin Kapp joined the company and shared the management with his father Bernhard Kapp and Roman Luft.

In 1997, the KAPP Group acquired NILES Werkzeugmaschinen  GmbH with 80 employees. NILES was founded 1898 in Berlin and had gear grinding machines for large gears in the portfolio. 2006 KAPP ASIA TECHNOLOGIES was established in the People's Republic of China.

In 2014, the group of companies with 850 employees worldwide offers a wide range of machine tools for hard fine machining of gears and profiles. External or internal gears for applications in the automotive, aerospace and compressor industries, drive technology, energy and wind power, railway technology, raw materials extraction and shipbuilding can be ground with these machines.

In March 2017, the sales and service activities for Kapp Niles products in Russia and neighbouring countries were combined in Kapp Niles Russia, LLC, based in Moscow.

On 1 April 2017, the company Kapp Niles Metrology GmbH became active in the group of companies. The aim is the development, production and distribution of measuring machines, measuring devices and related services, especially for the quality control of gears and profiles. With this new product division, the group of companies is further expanding its product portfolio along the value chain.

In 2020, the Kapp Niles Group opened new branches in Ramos Arizpe, Mexico and Bangalore, India. These branches will expand accessibility in the respective markets and further strengthen the market position.

Martin Kapp retired from the company management on 1 July 2021. His sons Michael and Matthias Kapp have since continued the family tradition and strengthened the management with Helmut Nüssle and Michael Bär. Martin Kapp moved to the advisory board and chairs it.

Locations 

The headquarter is located in Coburg in Upper Franconia. Other German locations include Berlin and Großostheim. In total, the KAPP NILES group of companies has 12 locations worldwide, 9  production sites.

Products 
 Generating(profile)-grinding machines 
 Profile grinding machines 
 Tools(Dressing tools, grinding tools)
 Measuring machines, Metrology
 Services
 Digitisation

References 

Companies based in Bavaria
Engineering companies of Germany
German brands
Machine tool builders